The geography of Papua New Guinea describes the eastern half of the island of New Guinea, the islands of New Ireland, New Britain and Bougainville, and smaller nearby islands.  Together these make up the nation of Papua New Guinea in tropical Oceania, located in the western edge of the Pacific Ocean.

Papua New Guinea is largely mountainous, and much of it is covered with tropical rainforest. The New Guinea Highlands run the length of New Guinea, and the highest areas receive snowfall—a rarity in the tropics. The Highlands consist of a number of smaller ranges running west to east, such as the Finisterre Range which dominates the Huon Peninsula to the north of the city of Lae. At  it is the world's third largest island country.

Papua New Guinea has one land border—that which divides the island of New Guinea.  Across the 820 km (509 mi) border is the Papua province of Indonesia, which contains most of the western half of the island (West Papua was split off in 2003, and forms the remainder). Papua New Guinea's border with Indonesia is not straight; the border loops slightly to the west along the Fly River in the south-central part of New Guinea, on the western edge of Papua New Guinea's Western Province. There are maritime borders with Australia to the south and Solomon Islands to the southeast.

Physical geography

This makes it the 3rd largest island country in the world. Its coastline is 5 152 km long.

The northernmost point is Mussau Island (1°23' S), southernmost point is Hemenahei Island (11°29' S), easternmost point is Olava, Bougainville (155°57' E) and the westernmost point is either Bovakaka along the Fly River border with Indonesia or Mabudawan (140°54' E).

Papua New Guinea has several volcanoes, as it is situated along the Pacific Ring of Fire. Volcanic eruptions are not rare, and the area is prone to earthquakes and tsunamis because of this. The volcanic disturbance can often cause severe earthquakes, which in turn can also cause tsunamis. Papua New Guinea is also prone to landslides, often caused by deforestation in major forests. The mountainous regions of Papua New Guinea are the areas most susceptible to landslides causing damage.

Offshore islands include the small, forested Admiralty Islands, the largest of which is Manus, to the north of the main island of New Guinea. These have a distinct plant and animal life from the main island but the natural forest has been cleared in places for logging and agriculture.

A recent global remote sensing analysis suggested that there were 1,308 km² of tidal flats in Papua New Guinea, making it the 25th ranked country in terms of tidal flat area.

Rivers of PNG

Sepik

Fly

Purari

Climate
Tropical; northwest monsoon (December to March), southeast monsoon (May to October); slight seasonal temperature variation. In lower altitudes, the temperature is around 80 °F (27 °C) year round. But higher altitudes are a constant 70 °F (21 °C), and the highest altitudes, especially of Mount Wilhelm and Mount Giluwe, can see snow.

Climate change is expected to alter the temperature and precipitation of the country, with implications for wildlife, ecosystems and agriculture.

Climate data

Human geography

Maritime claims:
These are measured from claimed archipelagic baselines.
Continental shelf:
200-m depth or to the depth of exploitation
Exclusive economic zone:
.  nautical miles
Territorial sea:
12 nautical miles (22 km)

Land use
Natural resources:
gold, copper, silver, natural gas, timber, oil, fisheries

Land use:
arable land: 0.49%
permanent crops: 1.4%
other (forests, swamplands, etc.): 98.11% (2005 estimate)

Environmental issues

The rainforest is subject to deforestation as a result of growing commercial demand for tropical timber; forest clearance, especially in coastal areas, for plantations; pollution from mining projects.  If the trend continues, more than half the forest that existed when Papua New Guinea became independent from Australia in 1975 will be gone by 2021.

Environment - international agreements

signed, but not ratified
Antarctic-Environmental Protocol

signed and ratified
Climate Change-Kyoto Protocol

Extreme points

Extreme points 

 Northernmost point – Suf Island
 Northernmost point (mainland) – Sandaun Province
 Southernmost point – Vanatinai
 Southernmost point (mainland) – Near Suau, Samarai-Murua District 
 Westernmost point – Border with Indonesia, Western Province
 Easternmost point – Nukumanu Islands, North Solomons
 Easternmost point (mainland) – Milne Bay
 Highest point – Mount Wilhelm: 4,509 m
 Lowest point – Pacific Ocean: 0 m

See also

 List of rivers of Papua New Guinea
 List of volcanoes in Papua New Guinea
 List of highest mountains of New Guinea
 List of protected areas of Papua New Guinea
 Ecoregions of New Guinea
 Australia-New Guinea (continent)

References